Phthonerodes is a genus of moths of the family Xyloryctidae.

Species
 Phthonerodes anthracopsara Diakonoff, 1954
 Phthonerodes aristaepennis Diakonoff, 1954
 Phthonerodes cryptoleuca Diakonoff, 1954
 Phthonerodes peridela Common, 1964
 Phthonerodes scotarcha Meyrick, 1890

References

 
Xyloryctidae
Xyloryctidae genera